Pathiya is an unclassified Southern Dravidian language of India. It is close to Kalanadi.

References

Dravidian languages